John Harry Mortenson (November 24, 1930 – March 12, 2015) was an American politician who was a Democratic member of the Nevada General Assembly.

A nuclear physicist, Mortenson, he earned a Bachelor of Science degree from the University of Maryland. He went on to study at American University and Catholic University before earning his master's degree at Duke University. He worked at Los Alamos National Laboratory from 1962 to 1971.

Mortenson and his wife, Helen, a longtime consultant specializing in nuclear, radiological and environmental issues, "fought tooth and nail" against the redevelopment of Tule Springs, a large urban Las Vegas retreat, in order "to preserve the 250,000-year-old bone fragments of such prehistoric creatures as Mammoths and giant sloths known to be at the site." They succeeded in getting the site declared the Tule Springs Fossil Beds National Monument, permanently preserving and protecting the area for research and other scientific studies.

References

1930 births
2015 deaths
Nevada Democrats